Itasca  is a village in DuPage County, Illinois, United States. Per the 2020 census, the population was 9,543. Located approximately 25 miles northwest of downtown Chicago, Itasca is close to O'Hare International Airport, major expressways and rail transportation. Itasca is home to a country club, a resort and shares a border with Medinah's legendary golf course. The population was 9,725 at the 2020 census.  BusinessWeek rated Itasca as the Best Affordable Suburb in the state of Illinois.

History
Itasca was first settled by Elijah Smith in 1841. Smith practiced medicine in Boston. In May 1841, at the advice of his colleagues he set out to find a suitable site for doctoring, farming, and raising a family. He traveled from New York via Detroit and headed toward DuPage County. His parchment government land title dated March 10, 1843, was signed by John Tyler, President of the United States. The document gave Smith title to the land that is now bounded by the railroad tracks on the south, Maple Street on the west, Cherry Street on the east, and Division Street on the north.
The post office was established in 1846 and took on various names, such as Bremen, Pierce (after Charles Pierce, who ran a trading post), and Sagon. The name Itasca comes from Lake Itasca. In the 1860s the first school was built. It was a small wooden structure with one room. The building was located on a site near the present First Presbyterian Church.

In 1873 Smith plotted eighty acres of his land into lots. The Chicago and Pacific Railroad was completed from Chicago to Elgin, with stations at Bensenville, Wood Dale (called Lester) and Itasca. Smith gave the right-of-way to encourage location of the tracks through the settlement. He donated $400 to help build a station.

The Chicago and Pacific Railroad became insolvent. In 1880 the road went into the hands of the Chicago, Milwaukee, St. Paul and Pacific Railroad, a newly formed corporation combining several rail networks.

The citizens of Itasca decided in 1890 to incorporate into a village. At a meeting at his mill, A. G. Chessman was elected the first Village President. Irving Park Road was first called the Chicago and Elgin Road. At an 1891 Village Board meeting, the name was changed to Elgin Avenue.

The 1900s

The Village of Itasca created a Historical Commission in 1985 to retain the aesthetic beauty, character, and historical integrity of the Village. The Village of Itasca is committed to the preservation of its pre-1900 and early 1900 homes, buildings, structures, and places.

In 1987, the Village adopted the Historic Preservation Ordinance which provides a mechanism to identify and preserve the special distinctive historic, aesthetic, architectural and/or landscaping characteristics of the Village's cultural, social, economic, political and architectural history.

The Itasca Historical District includes the following area: Bounded on the north by North Street, on the south by Bloomingdale Road, east to Irving Park, Irving Park east to Rush Street; on the east by Cherry Street extended to Schiller Street then west to Rush Street, then south to Irving Park Road and on the west by Catalpa Avenue extended to Bloomingdale Road.

The Spire, which is Itasca's most familiar landmark, graces the top of what was formerly the Lutheran Church of St. Luke. This edifice was erected in 1907 by builder Fred Westendorf. Pastor Frederick Zersen served the congregation for thirty-eight years. Church services were in German. It was not until 1926 that English services were held twice a month. German was also taught in the church school.
Until 1916, there was no bank in Itasca. Herman H. Franzen took deposits for Village residents to the Roselle Bank each morning, making the trip regularly on the 9:00 AM train. In 1916, two banks opened within weeks of each other. The Itasca State Bank had as its president H. F. Lawrence. The cashier was Elmer H. Franzen. The second bank was called the Dairyman's Bank of Northern Illinois, and was opened by F. N. Peck. Peck opened a total of four banks, but the Depression forced him to close them all. The Franzen banks in Itasca, Roselle, and Fox Lake were sound throughout the hard times of the 1920s, and emerged successfully from the Depression.

Telephone service had come to Itasca in 1899. Electricity was first installed in some homes in 1923. The bustling community soon gained another facility. The Itasca Country Club was opened in the spring of 1925.

The rural village of the 1800s and early 1900s retained its atmosphere until the 1940s. A new word then began to enter the American vocabulary: suburb. The influence of the city increased as population increased. Commuting daily to the Loop became the routine for many of the Village wage earners. By 1982, the population had grown to 7,192. Annexations had resulted in fifty miles of Village streets, more parks, and two industrial areas to serve. Providing safety and service as population increased required the establishment of departments of public works, of sewer and water, of building and police. A park district, a Village library, and a fire district were formed.

High school students from Itasca attended Bensenville's Fenton High School and Glenbard High School, a combined Glen Ellyn-Lombard school. A high school district, District 108, was organized in 1953. Lake Park High School, with students from Itasca, Roselle, Medinah, Keeneyville and Bloomingdale, opened in September 1956.

Modern industry was foreign to Itasca until 1961 when Central Manufacturing District (CMD) bought about 400 acres on the western edge of the village. An industrial park was established, and such national companies as Continental Can and FMC soon moved in. In 1970, the Itasca Industrial Park was established to the east of the Village, and attracted many more industries.

Anvan Corporation built a Holiday Inn on Irving Park east of Route 53. The building was of modular construction, the first such hotel in the nation to be built in this manner.

In 1969, Carson Pirie Scott purchased Nordic Hills Country Club. Two 10-story tower hotel buildings were constructed adjacent to the eighteen-hole golf course. In 1973, the Carson Inn/Nordic Hills facility was annexed to the village. Today, it is the Eaglewood Resort.

In October 1979, Trammell Crow Company of Texas broke ground for Hamilton Lakes. A 420-room Stouffer Hotel and a ten-story office building, completed in 1981, constituted the first phase of the project, situated on 278 acres on the northwest edge of Itasca. To date 15 buildings out of an estimated 26 have been completed, amounting to 2,767,589 gross square feet of floor space with an ultimate development of 4,490,700 gross square feet. A 16-story office building was added to the complex in 1984.

In 1966, the Village purchased 60 acres of land south of Irving Park Road. This established a green belt area to ensure both open space and water retention. In 1968 the Spring Brook Nature Center was formed.

A Master Plan for this area was adopted in 1965, and continues to guide the community into its future. Itasca, having celebrated its 100th anniversary in 1990, continues to control its development according to the individuality of its past.

The overall growth and development of the Village has and is being controlled by the Comprehensive Plan that was first adopted in 1942 and has been amended in 1959, 1979, and 1993.

Shirley H. Ketter, the first female Mayor of Itasca monumentally served as Village President of Itasca from 1983 to 1997. Former Mayor Ketter is after whom Itasca's Ketter Drive was named in 1999 in honor of her role with the Hamilton Lakes Business Park, which according to Mayor Gigi Gruber, Ketter "created and developed the whole Hamilton project."

Outstanding residential neighborhoods, first-rate schools, and beautiful parks distinguish Itasca as a quality community. Most importantly, we have worked to retain our small town charm with a lovely historic district and churches of all architectural styles.

Geography
Itasca is located at  (41.974678, -88.018513).

Demographics
As of the 2020 census there were 9,543 people, 3,870 households, and 2,814 families residing in the village. The racial makeup of the village was 72.60% White, 2.33% African American, 0.66% Native American, 10.87% Asian, 0.00% Pacific Islander, 5.57% from other races, and 7.97% from two or more races. Hispanic or Latino of any race were 14.16% of the population.

There were 3,870 households, out of which 35.35% had children under the age of 18 living with them, 62.87% were married couples living together, 7.67% had a female householder with no husband present, and 27.29% were non-families. 17.36% of all households were made up of individuals, and 8.63% had someone living alone who was 65 years of age or older. The average household size was 2.71 and the average family size was 2.42.

The village's age distribution consisted of 15.6% under the age of 18, 5.9% from 18 to 24, 24% from 25 to 44, 36.2% from 45 to 64, and 18.3% who were 65 years of age or older. The median age was 48.2 years. For every 100 females, there were 91.1 males. For every 100 females age 18 and over, there were 87.0 males.

The median income for a household in the village was $99,706, and the median income for a family was $106,959. Males had a median income of $59,444 versus $38,333 for females. The per capita income for the village was $53,551. About 1.7% of families and 4.1% of the population were below the poverty line, including 4.8% of those under age 18 and 3.3% of those age 65 or over.

Note: the US Census treats Hispanic/Latino as an ethnic category. This table excludes Latinos from the racial categories and assigns them to a separate category. Hispanics/Latinos can be of any race.

Neighborhoods

Itasca's residential neighborhoods, for the most part, straddle the railroad tracks running through the village.  The railroad splits the town into the "North Side" and the "South Side". (Itasca has two unincorporated neighborhoods west of Rohlwing Road: Nordic Park near the intersection of Rohlwing and Bloomingdale Roads, and the Ranchettes near the intersection of Rohlwing and Irving Park Roads).

The four main are only four railroad crossings in Itasca, from west to east: IL 53/Rohlwing Road, Catalpa Street, Walnut Street, and CR 10/Prospect Avenue and several others in the Industrial Parks.

Walnut Street, between Bloomingdale Road and Division Street, is generally regarded as Itasca's "downtown". There is a 7-11, dry cleaners, Cucina Casale Italian Restaurant, Daddy O's Diner (formerly), Kean's Bakery, the train station, Tree Guys Pizza Pub, as well as Wine With Me and Helix Camera & Video. The town's landmarks include Itasca Baptist Church, and Usher Park, which is on Walnut Street. A riverwalk was recently added, and Gigi Gruber Lane is a tribute to former mayor Gigi Gruber.  Irving Park Road between Interstate 290 and First Street is also a commercial corridor, as well as the home of the town's Municipal Campus (library, museum, pool, fire station, and police station/village hall). West of I-290, Irving Park Road remains commercial, but with more national chain businesses (Holiday Inn, Subway, etc.) The Itasca post office is also on this stretch. The Holiday Inn located on Irving Park Road was in the process of being sold to the Haymarket Center, a drug rehabilitation company.

Education
Prior to 1995, Itasca's School District 10 had one PreK-5 elementary school on each side of town: Franzen School on the North Side and Raymond Benson Primary School (formerly Washington School) on the South Side. (Upon entering 6th grade, all students attend Peacock Jr. High (later renamed Peacock Middle School) on the town's North Side.  Itasca is served by High School District 108, Lake Park High School in nearby Roselle).

Beginning with the 1995–1996 school year, the elementary schools were consolidated: Benson Primary School, formerly Washington School, would become PreK-2nd Grade; Franzen Intermediate School would become 3rd-5th Grades.

St. Peter the Apostle Catholic Church and School offered elementary education in Itasca from 1963 until its closure in 2010.

St. Luke Lutheran Church and School dates back to 1885. The Church and school were relocated to their current location at Washington and Rush street in 1961.

Economy
Arthur J. Gallagher & Co., one of the world's largest insurance brokerage firms, Jewel-Osco (grocery stores), Walter E. Smithe (furniture), Midas and Fellowes, Inc. headquarters are located in Itasca. In 2014, Itasca-based LaunchPoint was ranked #100 in the Inc. (magazine) list of 5,000 fastest-growing private companies in the U.S. Additionally, PrimeCo had its headquarters in Itasca.
In 1946 Hugh S. Knowles founded Knowles Electronics in Itasca. Eaglewood Resort is in Itasca, adjacent to Medinah Country Club.

Transportation 

Itasca has a station on Metra's Milwaukee District/West Line, which provides daily rail service between Elgin and Chicago Union Station.

The town is also located at the junction of Interstate 290, Veterans Memorial Tollway, and the Elgin-O'Hare Expressway, making Itasca a prime location for commerce and industry in the northwest suburbs.

State Highway 19 (Irving Park Road), which connects Chicago and Elgin, runs east–west through the center of town. State Highway 53 (Rohlwing Road) runs north–south through the western edge of the village.

Notable people
Zach Ziemek, Olympic Athlete
Camden Murphy, NASCAR driver and monster truck driver

References

External links

 
1890 establishments in Illinois
Populated places established in 1890
Villages in DuPage County, Illinois
Villages in Illinois